Werner Gallusser (born 12 July 1923) was a Hungarian-born Swiss composer. His work was part of the music event in the art competition at the 1948 Summer Olympics.

References

External links
  

1923 births
Possibly living people
Olympic competitors in art competitions
Swiss male composers